The 2002–03 Israeli Premier League season saw Maccabi Tel Aviv win the title. It took place from the first match on 14 September 2002 to the final match on 31 May 2003.

Two teams from Liga Leumit were promoted at the end of the previous season: Hapoel Kfar Saba and Bnei Yehuda. The two teams relegated were Hapoel Haifa and Maccabi Kiryat Gat.

Teams and Locations

Twelve teams took part in the 2002-03 Israeli Premier League season, including ten teams from the 2001-02 season, as well as two teams that were promoted from the 2001-02 Liga Leumit.

Hapoel Kfar Saba were promoted as champions of the 2001-02 Liga Leumit. Bnei Yehuda were promoted as runners up. Bnei Yehuda and Hapoel Kfar Saba returned to the top flight after an absence of one and two seasons respectively.

Hapoel Haifa and Maccabi Kiryat Gat were relegated after finishing in the bottom two places in the 2001-02 season.

Final table

Results

First and second round

Third round

Top goal scorers

See also
2002–03 Toto Cup Al

Israeli Premier League seasons
Israel
1